The Candia Four Corners is an unincorporated community located near the center of the town of Candia, New Hampshire, in the United States.

Roads
The name "Four Corners" refers to three roads which intersect at the village center: High Street, Main Street, and Deerfield Road. High Street, running east–west, is a portion of New Hampshire Route 27, which stretches from Hooksett (to the west) to Hampton Beach, New Hampshire (to the east). This road was formerly the main east–west thoroughfare through southern New Hampshire, but was replaced by New Hampshire Route 101, a four-lane expressway to the south of the Four Corners. Main Street, departing to the south, and Deerfield Road, going north, make up a portion of New Hampshire Route 43, which originates in Candia at NH 101.

Businesses, organizations, and town facilities
Much of the town of Candia's business, governmental, and recreational facilities are located near the Four Corners. The Candia Town Hall, Moore Park, and the Smyth Public Library are also located on High Street. Deerfield Road is the location of the Candia Volunteer Fire Department's station and the Henry W. Moore School.

References

Unincorporated communities in New Hampshire
Unincorporated communities in Rockingham County, New Hampshire
Candia, New Hampshire